William McVey may refer to:
 William E. McVey, member of the U.S. House of Representatives
 William McVey (sculptor), American sculptor, animalier and teacher